Jerung or Jero is a moribund Kiranti language spoken in Nepal. The native language consultants whom Opgenort (2005) consulted, preferred the term ‘Jero’ to designate the language. The term ‘Jerung’, by contrast, is a toponym used in the names of several villages within the language area as well as the name of a village in the Wambule-speaking area. The Jerung language is mutually intelligible with Wambule. Jerung is spoken by more than 2,000 people living in Okhalḍhuṅgā and Sindhulī districts of eastern Nepal. Gerd Hanßon (1991) claims that there are three to four dialects of Jerung: Madhavpur, Balkhu-Sisneri, and Ratnawati (Sindhuli). However, according to Opgenort's (2005) consultants, there are only two major dialects: a northern dialect, which is spoken in Okhaldhunga District (ओखलढुङ्गा), and a southern dialect, which is spoken in Sindhuli District (सिनधुली).

Geographical distribution
Jerung is spoken in the following locations of Nepal (Ethnologue).

Sindhuli District, Janakpur Zone: Bahadur (बहादुर) khola west bank villages, Sunkosi (सुनकोशी) River south to Mohantar (मोहनटार) village (Southern dialect)
Okhaldhunga District, Sagarmatha Zone: Maulang Khola river area, north of the Sunkosi River (Northern dialect)

References

Sources
 Hanßon, Gerd. 1991. The Rai of eastern Nepal: ethnic and linguistic grouping. Findings of the Linguistic Survey of Nepal. Edited and provided with an introduction by Werner Winter. Kirtipur/Kathmandu: Linguistic Survey of Nepal and Centre for Nepal and Asian Studies, Tribhuvan University.
 Opgenort, Jean Robert. 2005. A grammar of Jero. With a historical comparative study of the Kiranti languages. Brill’s Tibetan Studies Library. Languages of the Greater Himalayan Region, 3. Leiden: Koninklijke Brill.

Kiranti languages
Languages of Nepal
Languages of Bagmati Province
Languages of Koshi Province